The Barbarians and England have played each other a total of 18 times to date. England have won 10 of those, and the Barbarians eight. All 18 matches have been played at Twickenham Stadium in London, but none has been awarded test status by the Rugby Football Union.

Summary

Matches

Barbarian F.C. matches
Barb